Paramacera is a genus of satyrid butterflies found in the Nearctic and Neotropical realms.

Species
Listed alphabetically:
Paramacera allyni Miller, 1972 – pine satyr
Paramacera chinanteca Miller, 1972
Paramacera copiosa Miller, 1972
Paramacera xicaque (Reakirt, [1867])

References

External links
Images representing Paramacera at Encyclopedia of Life

Euptychiina
Nymphalidae of South America
Butterfly genera
Taxa named by Arthur Gardiner Butler